Sambaa may be:
 Shambaa people
 Shambala language